The Gouden Leeuw was a Dutch ship of the line armed with 80-82 cannon. The ship was built for the Admiralty of Amsterdam in 1666 during the Second Anglo-Dutch War. The Gouden Leeuw was for a time the largest Dutch warship. During the Third Anglo-Dutch War, the ship served as the flagship of Lieutenant Admiral Cornelis Tromp. She was Tromp's flagship at the Battle of Texel in 1673, with the Irishman Thomas Tobiasz as his flag captain. She was broken up in 1686.

The name Gouden Leeuw was available, as a previous Dutch ship with the same name had been wrecked on the coral reefs of Liuqiu Island, then known to the Dutch as Lamay, in 1622. The crewmembers were killed by the native inhabitants of the island, which ultimately led to a planned massacre and depopulation in 1636, sanctioned by the Dutch East Indies' colonial government. 

The ship was featured in several paintings by Willem van de Velde the Younger. The most prominent of these was De Gouden Leeuw voor Amsterdam, painted in 1686.

Ships of the line of the Dutch Republic
1660s ships